Anton Josef Dräger, also known as Joseph Anton Draeger, a historical painter, was born at Trèves in 1794, and died at Rome in 1833.

Biography

He studied under Kugelgen in Dresden, but went in 1823 to Italy and took up his quarters in Rome, where he followed, as a nondescript in life and art, his own peculiar style of colouring. In his desire to attain the charm of the colours of the great Venetians, a very faded picture of that school led him to the conviction that they painted their pictures entirely in grey before putting on the bright colours. Working in this way he obtained an extraordinary clearness of colour, a good example of which is seen in his 'Moses protecting the Daughters of Jethro,' in the Berlin Gallery.

See also
 List of German painters

References

External links

19th-century German painters
German male painters
1794 births
1833 deaths
People from Trier
19th-century German male artists